Drew Brown (born October 30, 1995) is a gridiron football placekicker and punter who is currently a free agent. He played college football for the Nebraska Cornhuskers from 2014 to 2017.

Professional career
Brown was signed by the Toronto Argonauts of the Canadian Football League (CFL). He made his professional debut on October 12, 2018 and played in four games that year. He played in three games in 2019, completing three of five field goal attempts while notably missing a 33-yard attempt and shanking a kickoff out of bounds that led to a BC Lions' game-winning rouge in a tied game on July 6, 2019. He was released two days following that game on July 8, 2019.

References

External links
Toronto Argonauts bio 

1995 births
Living people
Canadian football placekickers
Canadian football punters
Nebraska Cornhuskers football players
Players of American football from Texas
People from Southlake, Texas
Toronto Argonauts players